DecodeME is an ongoing genome-wide association study that will search for genetic risk factors for ME/CFS. With a planned recruitment of 25,000 patients, it is expected to be the largest such study to date, and results are expected in 2024.

Background 
ME/CFS is a chronic medical condition that often causes significant disability, and whose cause is unknown. Genetic studies of ME/CFS have been done before, but without significant findings. The authors of a 2022 study suggested that research with more participants is needed to discover statistically significant differences.

DecodeME aims to perform such a large study. It is being run as a partnership between Action for ME and the University of Edinburgh's MRC Human Genetics Unit, with Chris Ponting as chief investigator, and with £3.2 million in funding from the UK's Medical Research Council and the National Institute for Health Research. The researchers have also worked with Forward ME and a group of patient advocates, the latter of which contributed to the design of the study.

History 
The study announced receipt of funding in June 2020, and recruitment was opened on 12 September, 2022. In January 2023, the team wrote that over 17,000 patients had completed the survey, and almost 9,000 were sent collection kits.

Methodology 
DecodeME is a genome-wide association study with a case-control design. Expected recruitment is at least 20,000 patients whose onset was not associated with COVID-19, and 5,000 people who were diagnosed with ME/CFS after COVID-19. DNA will be collected by sending patients kits to collect saliva at home and control samples will be obtained from the UK Biobank. There will also be a survey to collect data on symptoms. Results are expected to be published by September 2024. If new risk factors are identified, it may enable further research into potential causes, tests, or treatments.

References

External Links 
Official Site

Clinical research
Chronic fatigue syndrome
Genetics studies
Research in the United Kingdom